Redmann is a surname, and may refer to:

Bernd Redmann (born 1965), German composer and musicologist
Jan Redmann (born 1979), German politician (CDU)
Jean M. Redmann (born 1955), American novelist
Kirk Redmann (born 1961), American operatic tenor
Teal Redmann (born 1982), American actress

See also 
 Redman (surname)

Surnames

de:Redmann
fr:Redmann